Who's the Boss? is a 2013 Dominican Republic romantic comedy film written by Daniel Aurelio and directed by Ronni Castillo. The film was selected as the Dominican Republic entry for the Best Foreign Language Film at the 86th Academy Awards, but it was not nominated.

Cast
 Frank Perozo as Alex
 Nashla Bogaert as Natalie
 Cuquín Victoria as Don Frank
 Amauris Pérez as Eduardo
 Claudette Lali as Carolina
 Akari Endo as Melissa
 Sergio Carlo

See also
 List of submissions to the 86th Academy Awards for Best Foreign Language Film
 List of Dominican submissions for the Academy Award for Best Foreign Language Film

References

External links
 

2013 films
2013 comedy films
2013 romance films
2013 romantic comedy films
2010s Spanish-language films

Dominican Republic romantic comedy films